Shemya or Simiya is a small island in the Semichi Islands group of the Near Islands chain in the Aleutian Islands archipelago southwest of Alaska, at .

History

The Russian vessel Saint Peter and Paul wrecked at Shemya in 1762. Most of the crew survived.

A United States Air Force radar, surveillance, and weather station and aircraft refueling station, including a  runway, opened on Shemya in 1943 and is still in operation. The station, originally Shemya Air Force Base or Shemya Station, had 1,500 workers at its peak in the 1960s. In 1956, Northwest Airlines leased Shemya Island from the U.S. government to use as a refueling station on their North Pacific route. According to Northwest's website, that made them "the first airline to operate its own airport." Northwest was operating Lockheed Constellation L-1049G model propliners on its "Orient Express" service between the U.S. and Asia in 1956.

The United States Air Force airborne intelligence platforms "Cobra Ball", "Rivet Amber," and "Rivet Ball" flew intercontinental ballistic missile tracking flights from this island near the Soviet Union, especially the Kamchatka Peninsula, during the height of the Cold War. Observations from Shemya were normally the first radar reports of new Soviet satellite launches from Tyuratam (Baikonur) in the early days of satellite tracking; see Project Space Track.

The station was renamed the Eareckson Air Station in 1993 to honor USAF Colonel William O. Eareckson, who had commanded bomber operations during the Aleutian Campaign of World War II.

The station still operates as a radar station and aircraft refueling station with a staff of about 180 people. The 2000 census reported an official resident population of 27 persons on the island.

One of the most recognizable features of the island is the COBRA DANE radar system. This radar was built in 1976 and brought on-line in 1977 for the primary mission of intelligence gathering in support of verification of the Strategic Arms Limitation Talks (SALT) II agreement.

Shemya was an important outpost during the Cold War. As part of Project Bluegrass, the White Alice Communications System provided a vital tropospheric scatter communications link to the mainland during the early-1960s to late-1970s. Its two  parabolic reflectors and 50 kW transmitter output bridged the nearly  gap to Adak, Alaska.

List of commercial flights diverted to Shemya 
 See also .
 China Eastern Airlines Flight 583 made an emergency landing at the island's airbase at April 6, 1993.
 American Airlines Flight 175, a Boeing 777-200ER, from Dallas Fort Worth, Texas (DFW/KDFW) to Tokyo Narita, Japan (NRT/RJAA) made an emergency landing due to indication of cargo fire on July 11, 2010.
 Cathay Pacific Flight 884 from Hong Kong to Los Angeles made an emergency landing at the island's airbase due to smoke detection on July 29, 2015.
 Delta Air Lines Flight 128 made an emergency landing on the island's airbase on December 24, 2018, when the Boeing 767-300ER developed engine problems.
 Polar Air Cargo Flight 717 made an emergency landing at the island's airport on March 13, 2020.

Former airline service 
Reeve Aleutian Airways (RAA) operated scheduled passenger service into Shemya for many years.  During the 1970s and 1980s, Reeve operated nonstop flights to Anchorage (ANC) with Lockheed L-188 Electra turboprop aircraft.  By 1989, the airline was operating nonstop jet service to Anchorage with Boeing 727-100 combi aircraft which were capable of transporting passengers and freight on the main deck of the aircraft. Reeve's 727 service from Anchorage continued during the 1990s as did 727 flights from Adak Island, AK and Cold Bay, AK. Reeve Aleutian ceased all flight operations in 2000.

Climate 
The weather on Shemya is very drastic, though the temperatures only vary between single digits to the mid fifties, and the climate is perhaps the most equatorward low-altitude occurrence of a polar climate (ET) in the world, though it is extremely close to a subpolar oceanic climate (Cfc) (or a subarctic climate if the 0 degree Celsius isotherm is used). The Japanese current in the Pacific to the south of the island regulates the temperature and gives it the pronounced temperature lag (August and September are the warmest months and the island's record low occurred in April). Despite it being a tundra climate, it is spared the vicious cold of places like Utqiagvik, Alaska where temperatures in winter can rival those of interior Alaska in winter.

References

Shemya Island: Block 1147, Census Tract 1, Aleutians West Census Area, Alaska United States Census Bureau

External links

 Web site about Shemya
 Briefing about Shemya Global Security
 "A Tale of Two Airplanes" by Kingdon R. "King" Hawes, Lt Col, USAF (Ret.)

Semichi Islands
Islands of Unorganized Borough, Alaska
Islands of Alaska